The European Institute of Oncology (IEO) is a non-profit private-law comprehensive cancer centre located in Milan, Italy.  It is a clinic, a research centre and a training institution. IEO is a member of EU-LIFE, an alliance of leading life science research centres in Europe.

The European Institute of Oncology works on the prevention, diagnosis and treatment of cancer by developing clinical and scientific research coupled with organisation and management. It provides a professional network for its members.

History
The European Institute of Oncology was conceived by Umberto Veronesi, who developed a new model for health and advanced research in the international oncology field.  The institute was inaugurated in May 1994 and is today managed by Division and Unit Directors from eight European countries.

The Institute became a research hospital and treatment centre (IRCCS or ) through the Ministerial Decree issued in January 1996. The European Institute of Oncology provides services through agreements with Italy’s National Health Service. Professor Gordon McVie performs outreach activities on behalf of the IEO. 
 
The Institute integrates various activities involved in the fight against cancer: prevention and diagnosis, health education and training, research and treatment.

At its centre in Via Ripamonti  all clinical, research and training activities take place.  In 2002 the institute opened IEO CENTRO, an integrated cancer diagnosis centre in downtown Milan.

Journal

ecancermedicalscience is the non-profit open-access journal of the European Institute of Oncology. Founded by Professors Umberto Veronesi and Gordon McVie in 2007, ecancermedicalscience is published by Cancer Intelligence and forms part of ecancer.org.

In 2014, Managing Editor Gordon McVie was accepted as a Scholar Member of the World Association of Medical Editors.

Business model
ecancermedicalscience is a non-profit journal supported by charitable funding. The key founding charities are The Umberto Veronesi Foundation, the European Institute of Oncology Foundation and Swiss Bridge.

In 2014, ecancermedicalscience became the first open-access journal to charge article fees based on a "pay what you can afford" model. Authors with access to publication funding may donate voluntarily to the journal to cover publication costs. Authors without access to funding do not have to pay any portion of the publishing costs.

In the news
In June 2014, a case report published in ecancermedicalscience received international media attention. The case report described a young Latin American girl whose fits of inappropriate laughter were mistakenly diagnosed as misbehavior or demonic possession, but were found to be Gelastic seizures caused by a brain tumor.

Abstracting and indexing
ecancermedicalscience is indexed in the following repositories:

Memberships
 Open Access Scholarly Publishers Association, of which ecancermedicalscience is a member
 Committee on Publication Ethics, of which ecancermedicalscience is a member.

References

External links 
European Institute of Oncology Website 
ecancermedicalscience (Open Access journal of the European Institute of Oncology) 

Hospitals established in 1994
Hospitals in Milan
Medical research institutes in Italy
Cancer organizations
International medical associations of Europe
International organisations based in Italy
1994 establishments in Italy